Bill, Willy or William Schroeder or Schröder may refer to:

Sports personalities

American football
William E. Schroeder, American football coach during 1914–16
Bill Schroeder (halfback) (born 1923), American football halfback for the AAFC's Chicago Rockets; also a professional basketball player for the Sheboygan Red Skins
Bill Schroeder (wide receiver) (born 1971), American football wide receiver

Other sports
Bill Schroeder, American co-founder of 1936 Helms Athletic Foundation
Willy Schröder (1912–1990), German discus thrower in 1936 Olympics
Bill Schroeder (baseball) (born 1958), American platoon / bench player; later TV broadcaster

Politicians
William A. Schroeder (1889–1961), American attorney and legislator in Wisconsin
Wil Schroder (born 1982), American politician who has served in the Kentucky Senate since 2015.

Others
William Howard Schröder (1851–1892), South African artist, cartoonist and publisher
William Charles Schroeder (1895–1977), American ichthyologist
Willy Schröder, German silent film actor in 1924's Comedians of Life
William J. Schroeder (1932–1986), American recipient of artificial heart
William R. Schroeder, American philosopher; author of 1984's Sartre and His Predecessors
William Knox Schroeder (1950–1970), American student killed during Kent State shootings

See also
Willy Schroeders (1932–2017), Belgian professional road bicycle racer